Audrey Rousseau (born 23 November 1999) is a Canadian artistic gymnast who competed at the 2015 World Championships. At the 2015 City of Jesolo Trophy, she won a team bronze medal and tied for 18th in the all-around. At the 2019 Mersin World Challenge Cup, she won the gold medal on the balance beam.

References

1999 births
Living people
Canadian female artistic gymnasts
Gymnasts from Montreal
People from LaSalle, Quebec
20th-century Canadian women
21st-century Canadian women